Joe Glenn may refer to:

 Joe Glenn (American football) (born 1949), American football coach
 Joe Glenn (baseball) (1908–1985), Major League catcher